Rascal is a platform game developed by Traveller's Tales and published by Psygnosis for the PlayStation. The main character and several enemies were designed by Jim Henson's Creature Shop.

Plot
Professor Casper Clockwise is in his lab making the final adjustments to his time-traveling device when someone creeps behind him. Meanwhile, his son Callum "Rascal" Clockwise is walking through a secret route under the house to get to his father's lab. The lights go out and an alarm sounds. Rascal rushes down to see the problem, but two aliens in spacecraft appear and chase him down the corridor.

Rascal makes it to his father's lab by going through the safe door entrance. He finds Chronon, the evil master of time, holding his father hostage with another of his dad's inventions called the "Bubble Gun". Chronon accidentally activates the controls for the time machine, and he and the Professor are sucked into the time portal. The Bubble Gun drops from it and lands at the feet of Rascal. He picks it up, vowing to save his father.

Rascal chases the two through the timestream, from the medieval Castle Hackalott to the Aztec Temple at Chichimeca, to the lost city of Atlantis, to the Jolly Raider pirate ship and Dodgy City in the old West, traveling to each location's past and present forms and collecting the pieces of a Time Clock from both before fighting Chronon in each area's future. Rascal travels to the Corridors of Time, Chronon's lair within the space-time continuum, where, after defeating its guardians brought from each of the other time periods, he defeats Chronon and rescues his father. After escaping using another time portal that leads back into the hallway of Rascal's house, Rascal and his father return safely back home, leaving the portal to shatter apart on Chronon, trapping him within interdimensional time forever.

Gameplay
In the game, the player assumes the role of Rascal armed with the Bubble Gun, in a mission through five worlds - Castle Hackalott (a medieval castle), Chichimeca Temple (an ancient Aztec temple), the aquatic city of Atlantis, The Jolly Raider (a pirate ship), and Dodgy City (a town in the Wild West). Each world has three forms: past, present, and future (e.g. Castle Hackalott appears as a medieval castle in the past while in the present day, it has become a museum). The player needs only to complete the past level to gain access to the next world. In each past and present level, the player has to find the six pieces of the Time Clock (some of which are held by certain enemies) in order to access the Time Bubble and complete the level, in turn unlocking the next form of that world. Each future level has a boss battle against Chronon and defeating him in all five gives access to the final world. The Bubble Gun has limited ammo, and the range and strength of the bubbles depends on how much ammo is left. In most levels, minor enemies will spawn from Time Bubbles over time (usually those to do with the level theming itself) and when defeated, they will leave behind various items such as Bubble Gun ammo (in either green or red; the latter can temporarily grant the bubbles with homing capabilities), hearts that will restore health and "Chronon's Gift" (a red skull and crossbones) which will cause damage to the player if picked up.

Development
The game was showcased at E3 1997. Traveller's Tales founder Jon Burton revealed in a video posted in September 2018, that the poor controls were a result of the publisher requesting that the controls be changed from directional movement to tank controls similar to Tomb Raider, leading to issues with how the game's camera engine was designed. Burton also claimed his involvement in the game was limited due to being preoccupied with Sonic R and that effectively made the publisher in charge.

Reception

The game received generally unfavorable reviews according to the review aggregation website GameRankings. Next Generation said that the game was "more of a technological achievement (one of the only PlayStation games with no noticeable load time) than a game, and worth picking up only for those who enjoy being annoyed".

Notes

References

External links
 
 

1998 video games
3D platform games
PlayStation (console) games
PlayStation (console)-only games
Psygnosis games
Single-player video games
Takara video games
Traveller's Tales games
Video games about time travel
Video games scored by Andy Blythe and Marten Joustra
Video games set in castles
Video games developed in the United Kingdom